Underconstruction 1: Silence is an EP by Italian DJ Gigi D'Agostino, released on 5 July 2003 through ZYX Music.

Track listing
 "Silence (Vision 2)"  – 6:15
 "Complex"  – 9:16
 "Sonata"  – 4:51
 "Apache"  – 6:53
 "Ripassa"  – 5:16
 "Pop Corn"  – 5:23
 "Percorrendo"  – 7:08
 "Silence (Vision 3)"  – 10:09
 "Taurus (Vision 2)"  – 7:38
 "Hymn (Vision 2)"  – 7:31
 "Son"  – 4:26

References

Gigi D'Agostino albums
2003 EPs